In mathematics, the Adams spectral sequence is a spectral sequence introduced by  which computes the stable homotopy groups of topological spaces. Like all spectral sequences, it is a computational tool; it relates homology theory to what is now called stable homotopy theory. It is a reformulation using homological algebra, and an extension, of a technique called 'killing homotopy groups' applied by the French school of Henri Cartan and Jean-Pierre Serre.

Motivation

For everything below, once and for all, we fix a prime p. All spaces are assumed to be CW complexes. The ordinary cohomology groups  are understood to mean .

We call this the collection of stable maps from X to Y. (This is the starting point of stable homotopy theory; more modern treatments of this topic begin with the concept of a spectrum. Adams' original work did not use spectra, and we avoid further mention of them in this section to keep the content here as elementary as possible.)

The set  turns out to be an abelian group, and if X and Y are reasonable spaces this group is finitely generated. To figure out what this group is, we first isolate a prime p. This is a good idea because cohomology groups are usually tractable to compute.

The key idea is that  is more than just a graded abelian group, and more still than a graded ring (via the cup product). The representability of the cohomology functor makes H*(X) a module over the algebra of its stable cohomology operations, the Steenrod algebra A. Thinking about H*(X) as an A-module forgets some cup product structure, but the gain is enormous: Hom(H*(Y), H*(X)) can now be taken to be A-linear! A priori, the A-module sees no more of [X, Y] than it did when we considered it to be a map of vector spaces over Fp. But we can now consider the derived functors of Hom in the category of A-modules, ExtAr(H*(Y), H*(X)). These acquire a second grading from the grading on H*(Y), and so we obtain a two-dimensional "page" of algebraic data. The Ext groups are designed to measure the failure of Hom's preservation of algebraic structure, so this is a reasonable step.

The point of all this is that A is so large that the above sheet of cohomological data contains all the information we need to recover the p-primary part of [X, Y], which is homotopy data. This is a major accomplishment because cohomology was designed to be computable, while homotopy was designed to be powerful. This is the content of the Adams spectral sequence.

Classical formulation

Formulation for computing homotopy groups of spectra 
Then, there is a spectral sequence  such that

  for  the mod  Steenrod algebra

Also, because for any CW-complex  we can consider the suspension spectrum , this gives the statement of the previous formulation as well.

This statement generalizes a little bit further by replacing the -module  with the cohomology groups  for some connective spectrum  (or topological space ).

Spectral sequence for the stable homotopy groups of spheres 
For example, if we let both spectra be the sphere spectrum, so , then the Adams spectral sequence has the convergence propertygiving a technical tool for approaching a computation of the stable homotopy groups of spheres. It turns out that many of the first terms can be computed explicitly from purely algebraic informationpp 23–25.

Ext terms from the resolution 
Given the Adams resolutionwe have the -terms asfor the graded Hom-groups. Then the -page can be written asso the degree of  can be thought of how "deep" in the Adams resolution we go before we can find the generators.

Calculations 
The sequence itself is not an algorithmic device, but lends itself to problem solving in particular cases.

Grading of the Differential 
The th Adams differential always goes to the left 1, and up . That is, .

Examples with Eilenberg–Maclane spectra 
For the first case, we have the  pagegiving a collapsed spectral sequence, hence . This can be rewritten asgiving the -page. For the other case, note there is a cofiber sequencewhich ends up giving a splitting in cohomology, so  as -modules. Then, the -page of  can be read asThe expected -page is.The only way for this spectral sequence to converge to this page is if is there are non-trivial differentials supported on every element with Adams grading .

Other applications 
Adams' original use for his spectral sequence was the first proof of the Hopf invariant 1 problem:  admits a division algebra structure only for n = 1, 2, 4, or 8. He subsequently found a much shorter proof using cohomology operations in K-theory.

The Thom isomorphism theorem relates differential topology to stable homotopy theory, and this is where the Adams spectral sequence found its first major use: in 1960, John Milnor and Sergei Novikov used the Adams spectral sequence to compute the coefficient ring of complex cobordism. Further, Milnor and C. T. C. Wall used the spectral sequence to prove Thom's conjecture on the structure of the oriented cobordism ring: two oriented manifolds are cobordant if and only if their Pontryagin and Stiefel–Whitney numbers agree.

Stable homotopy groups of spheres 

Using the spectral sequence above for  we can compute several terms explicitly, giving some of the first stable homotopy groups of spheres. Since  is in degree , we have a surjectionwhere  has a generator in degree  denoted . For example,Notice that the last two elements of  map to the same element, which follows from the Adem relations. Also, there are elements in the kernel, such as  sincebecause of the Adem relation. We can apply the same process and get a kernel , resolve it, and so on. When we do, we get an -page which looks like
which can be expanded by computer up to degree  with relative ease. Using the found generators and relations, we can calculate the -page with relative easy. Sometimes homotopy theorists like to rearrange these elements by having the horizontal index denote  and the vertical index denote  giving a different type of diagram for the -pagepg 21. See the diagram above for more information.

Generalizations 

The Adams–Novikov spectral sequence is a generalization of the Adams spectral sequence introduced by  where ordinary cohomology is replaced by a generalized cohomology theory, often complex bordism or Brown–Peterson cohomology. This requires knowledge of the algebra of stable cohomology operations for the cohomology theory in question, but enables calculations which are completely intractable with the classical Adams spectral sequence.

See also 

 Postnikov system
 Steenrod algebra
 Spectrum (topology)
Adams resolution

References

 

 .

Overviews of computations 

  – computes all Adams spectral sequences for the stable homotopy groups of spheres up to degree 90

Higher-order terms

External links

Notes

Homotopy theory
Spectral sequences